USS Paul Ignatius (DDG-117) is an  of the United States Navy. She is named for Paul Ignatius who served as United States Secretary of the Navy under President Lyndon Johnson from 1967 to 1969. Ignatius had previously served as a lieutenant in the Navy during World War II. Paul Ignatius is the second of eight planned Flight IIA "technology insertion" ships, which contains elements of the Flight III ships.

Paul Ignatius was launched on 12 November 2016, and was christened on 8 April 2017. She was commissioned on 27 July 2019 Port Everglades in Fort Lauderdale, Florida. The ship was sponsored by Ignatius' wife Nancy before her passing and that role has since been taken over by their grand-daughter, 
Dr. Elisa Ignatuis. Paul Ignatius is homeported in Rota, Spain.

Operational history
On 28 April 2022, Paul Ignatius departed Mayport, Florida, for a patrol in the US Sixth Fleet area of operations and a homeport shift to Naval Station Rota.

On 17 June 2022, Paul Ignatius arrived at her new homeport of in Rota, Spain. Her Phalanx CIWS was moved to the forward mount and she received the SeaRAM close-in weapon system on her aft mount.

In the autumn of 2022, Paul Ignatius conducted a routine patrol in the Baltic Sea, where she was accompanied by the support ship . The ship also passed the area in the Baltic Sea where Nord Stream gas pipelines have been sabotaged. According to Danish media, the destroyer assisted in "guarding the crime scene of the gas leaks".

External links

USS Paul Ignatius official website

References

 

Arleigh Burke-class destroyers
2016 ships